Ludwik Konopko (born December 7, 1970 in Lviv) is a Polish guitarist, composer, and arranger. His guitar music incorporates elements of blues, jazz, flamenco, and world music. He is the leader of the ZOA Band and a member of the Pilar group. He also collaborates with the well-recognized Polish flamenco group Que Passa. Earlier, he was a leader of Acoustic Travel Band and a co-founder of the Cocotier band. Ludwik Konopko is a multi-competition finalist, and his independently produced records, covering mostly his own compositions, were sold in tens of thousands of copies.

Musical biography 
Konopko was born in Lviv in western Ukraine. He had his first public appearance as a guitarist at the age of 19, when he performed in an orchestra conducted by the composer Virko Baley at the Lviv National Philharmonic. In 1989 together with Oleh Suk he created his first band Tea Fan Club (TFC) in Lviv. The art-rock group quickly became very popular and attracted other well-recognized musicians, like Oleksandr Ksenofontov or Vlad DeBriansky. In 1990 the TFC band performed during the youth festival of alternative culture Vyvych. Tea Fan Club is still considered today a legendary musical project in Ukraine.
Since 1991 Ludwik Konopko has been living in Poland. In 1999 he created the band Cocotier together with Andrzej Krośniak and in 2002 Ludwik Konopko founded his own Acoustic Travel Band. Both groups performed all over Europe for several years and participated in many musical festivals, among others, in Ferrara, Novara, Olegio, and Orte. Their records, including primarily compositions and arrangements by Ludwik Konopko, were sold in tens of thousands of copies. In 2005 Ludwik Konopko performed with Acoustic Travel Band as support before the world acclaimed guitarist Al di Meola at the Non-Stop Festival in Wroclaw.From 2014 to 2016 Ludwik Konopko collaborated with the integrative entertainment group with theatrical and musical background Drzewo a Gada in Katowice. Between 2016 and 2018 he cooperated with one of the best Polish flamenco fusion groups Que Passa. They performed together on many tours and participated in several festivals, among others, in Landshut, Rudolstadt or Lund.
Since 2012 Ludwik Konopko is a part of the Pilar band frequently performing both in Poland and abroad. In 2019 he founded his own ZOA Band and remains its leader until today. Ludwik Konopko invited to the group very experienced musicians, who inspire each other and enjoy playing together. They perform original compositions by Ludwik Konopko and guitar covers of other authors.

The guitar music of Ludwik Konopko combines several styles, among others blues, jazz, flamenco, and world music. Moreover, in his compositions and arrangements, he often uses complex multi-instrumental layouts. For his songs, Ludwik Konopko received a Special Mention from the Jury of the International Songwriting Awards (UK) and an Honorable Mention from the Jury of the 2022 Unsigned Only Music Competition (USA). He was also a finalist of the 20th UK Songwriter Contest (UK), the 18th International Acoustic Music Awards (USA), and the 23rd Annual Great American Song Contest (USA).  His creativity, musical feeling, extraordinary guitar technique, and freedom of improvisation gained him many fans. Ludwik Konopko performs solo and with other musicians and bands for more than three decades. Often, he can be spotted unexpectedly outdoors in different cities of Poland where he promotes his records among people.

Discography 

 Cafe Sanacja – Cocotier (2001)
 Acoustic Travel – Acoustic Travel Band (2002)
 Kundzia – Acoustic Travel Band (2005)
 Come Back – Acoustic Travel Band (2007)
 O.K. – Acoustic Travel Band (2008)
 Twarze (2010)
 Taruna (2012)
 Nasz Poddasze – Pilar (2014)
 Free Time (2016, 2021)
 Skrzydła – Pilar (2020)
RAIA (2021)

References

External links 

 
 Ludwik Konopko at AllAboutJazz
 

Smooth jazz guitarists
Jazz-blues guitarists
Jazz fusion guitarists
Music arrangers
Electroacoustic music composers
Polish jazz composers
Flamenco guitarists
1970 births
Living people
Polish musicians
Polish guitarists
Polish composers